State Route 84 (SR 84) is a state highway in the U.S. state of California that consists of two unconnected segments, one in the San Francisco Bay Area and the other primarily in the Sacramento–San Joaquin River Delta area.

The first section is an east–west arterial road running from SR 1 in San Gregorio to Menlo Park, across the Dumbarton Bridge through Fremont and Newark and ending at I-580 in Livermore. The segment between Marsh Road and the Dumbarton Bridge has been upgraded to an expressway and is known as the Bayfront Expressway. The segment from the eastern end of the Dumbarton Bridge to the interchange with I-880 has been upgraded to a freeway.

The other section is a north-south arterial road that begins at SR 12 in Rio Vista, passes through Ryer Island (where it connects to SR 220), and ends in West Sacramento. The Ryer Island Ferry provides the crossing over Cache Slough from Rio Vista to Ryer Island. The ferry is a diesel-powered boat operated by Caltrans, and is in operation twenty-four hours per day and charges no toll. There are no plans to connect the two unconnected segments of SR 84 at this time.

Route description

Southern section 
The route begins at SR 1 on the Pacific coast near San Gregorio. It then heads northeast through San Mateo County, following San Gregorio Road and La Honda Road and crossing the Santa Cruz Mountains. As it enters Woodside, it intersects SR 35, also known as Skyline Boulevard. From the juncture of La Honda Road with Portola Road to US 101 it follows Woodside Road. After intersecting I-280, it enters Redwood City, where it intersects SR 82, which carries El Camino Real through the South Bay. A few miles later, it interchanges with US 101, which it overlaps for a few miles. 

Upon routing eastward, it enters the city of Menlo Park as an expressway, called the Bayfront Expressway, which features traffic signals at Menlo Park streets, at driveways serving Facebook headquarters, and at intersections with SR 114 and SR 109. The Marsh Road intersection, in 2013, was the site where a car fatally struck cyclist Sam Felder, a Facebook employee. The SR 114 (Willow Road) intersection was the site of a car crash in which author David Halberstam was killed on April 23, 2007.

SR 84 then becomes a freeway at the south end of San Mateo County as it crosses as the Dumbarton Bridge over the San Francisco Bay. Midway over the bridge, it enters Alameda County. In Alameda County, it runs northward through the city of Newark, where it begins a concurrency southwards with I-880 for about one mile. Both interchanges with I-880 are partial cloverleaf interchanges. Upon separation, however, the route is not built to freeway standards as it enters the city of Fremont, following the streets of Thornton Ave, Fremont Blvd, Peralta Blvd, and Mowry Ave, which after, it has a short concurrency northwards with SR 238.

SR 84 then leaves Fremont through the historic Sunol Valley. Parts of the valley are extremely narrow and are referred to as Niles Canyon; this part of the route is officially a scenic route. After exiting the valley, it begins an overlap with I-680. After separating, it runs through Vallecitos Valley. It then goes over grasslands until it reaches a pass, then enters the city of Livermore with Ruby Hill development on the left. SR 84 then runs along Isabel Ave until it meets I-580, as the end of its southern section. SR 84 is unconstructed from I-580 to SR 12.

Northern section 

The second section of SR 84 starts in Rio Vista at SR 12. It then follows the Ryer Island Ferry, which carries the route across the Cache Slough. When it leaves the ferry, it intersects SR 220. It continues northward and meets the end of state maintenance at the West Sacramento city limit, about six miles east of an intersection with CR E19. It then enters the city of West Sacramento in Yolo County. It then interchanges with I-80 Business, also signed as US 50. As it continues northward, it ends at I-80. From north of West Sacramento, SR 84 has been relinquished and was given to the city of West Sacramento in 2003.

SR 84 is part of the California Freeway and Expressway System, and from I-280 to the eastern Fremont city limits and from the southern terminous of Isabel Avenue in Livermore to I-580 is part of the National Highway System, a network of highways that are considered essential to the country's economy, defense, and mobility by the Federal Highway Administration. SR 84 is eligible for the State Scenic Highway System, and is designated as a scenic highway by the California Department of Transportation from SR 238 to I-680 in Alameda County, meaning that it is a substantial section of highway passing through a "memorable landscape" with no "visual intrusions", where the potential designation has gained popular favor with the community.

History

Original routing
Until recent years, all of CA-84 consisted of narrow, two-lane roads in California. This has remained almost unchanged except for urban areas and the CA-84 widening project in the Tri-Valley.

Modern history

Mid-State Tollway
Route 84 is legally defined to continue from I-580 to SR 4 in Antioch, but there are currently no plans in place to bridge the gap at this time. A plan to build a $600 million toll road called the Mid-State Tollway along the proposed route was suspended in 2001 due to local opposition.

CA-84 widening project
In the late 2000s and 2010s, a widening project began on Route 84 from I-680 near Sunol to I-580 in Livermore. This included a better connection between Stanley Boulevard and Isabel Avenue. The project was to be done in five phases:
 Isabel Avenue/I-580 interchange
 Jack London Boulevard to Concannon Boulevard, including connections to Stanley Boulevard
 Concannon Boulevard to Vallecitos Road intersection and southern Ruby Hill entrance
 Northern side of pass
 Southern side of pass to I-680
Costs were estimated to be between $400 and $500 million.

As of mid 2019, phases 1, 2, 3 and 4 are complete. This still leaves the southern section of CA 84 in its original condition.

Major intersections

See also

References

External links

Bay Area FasTrak – includes toll information on the Dumbarton Bridge and the other Bay Area toll facilities
California @ AARoads - State Route 84
Caltrans: Route 84 highway conditions
Caltrans: Mid-State Tollway
California Highways: SR 84

084
084
084
State Route 084
State Route 084
State Route 084
State Route 084